Caroline Loeb (born 5 October 1955) is a French actress, radio host, singer, and director. In 1986, she co-wrote and recorded the hit single "C'est la ouate".

Filmography
 1973 : La Maman et la Putain by Jean Eustache
 1974 : Mes petites amoureuses by Jean Eustache
 1978 : Dirty Dreamer by Jean-Marie Périer
 1978 : Flammes by Adolfo Arrieta
 1979 : Lady Oscar by Jacques Demy
 1980 : L'Ombre d'un jeu by Uziel Peres
 1981 : Quartet by James Ivory
 1982 : Jimmy jazz by Laurent Perrin
 1984 : La Nuit porte-jarretelles by Virginie Thévenet
 1984 : Mode in France by William Klein
 1985 : Les Nanas by Annick Lanoë
 1987 : Cœurs croisés by Stéphanie de Mareuil
 1991 : La Montre, la Croix et la Manière (The Favour, the Watch and the Very Big Fish) by Ben Lewin
 1997 : Baby-sitter blues by Williams Crépin (TV)
 2003 : Sami by Serge Moati (TV)
 2004 : Vénus et Apollon (TV)
 2008 : Like a Star Shining in the Night by René Féret
 2008 : Rien dans les poches by Marion Vernoux (TV)
 2021 : Un instant de bonheur de Raffaël Enault : La femme au feu

Television 
 2008 : X Femmes, Season 1, Episode 5. Director

Discography

Albums
 1983 : Piranana (ZE Records)
 1987 : Loeb C.D. (Barclay)
 2004 : Best of (Choice of Music)
 2007 : Crime parfait (8 Songs) (On Peut/Digitallmajor)
 2009 : Crime parfait (13 songs) (On Peut/Believe)
 2019: Comme Sagan

Singles
 1983 : "Malibu"
 1986 : "C'est la ouate" / "And so What" (#1 Italy, #3 Spain, #5 France, #10 Germany, #30 Austria)
 1987 : "À quoi tu penses?" (#27 Italy, #67 Germany)
 1988 :" Amants zaimants"
 1988 : "Le Telefon"
 1988 : "Mots croisés"
 1995 : "J'te hais dans la peau"

Bibliography
 1992 : Tallulah, darling et autres chansons, illustrated by Lolo Miegemolle, Rouleau libre, Paris
 1992 : Saint Valentin et Rintintin, illustrated by Lolo Miegemolle, Recto Verso, Paris
 1999 : Bon chic chroniques, Collection Points Virgule, Le Seuil, Paris
 2002 : Shirley, Shirley Goldfarb, Éditions Espaces 34,
 2006 : Has been, Roman, Flammarion, Paris
 2015 : 'Mes années 80 de A à Z' Editions vents de sable

References

External links

 
 
 Official website

1955 births
Living people
People from Neuilly-sur-Seine
20th-century French non-fiction writers
French film actresses
French-language singers
French television presenters
ZE Records artists
French television actresses
20th-century French actresses
21st-century French actresses
Loeb, Caroline
French women television presenters